Fidelity Building may refer to:

 Fidelity Building (Baltimore), a skyscraper in Baltimore, Maryland
 Fidelity Building (Benton Harbor, Michigan), an office building listed on the U.S. National Register of Historic Places (NRHP)
 Fidelity Building (Knoxville), an NRHP-listed office building in Knoxville, Tennessee

See also
 Fidelity Trust Building, Buffalo, New York
Fidelity Trust Building (Indianapolis, Indiana), NRHP-listed
The Fidelity National Bank and Trust Company Building, Kansas City, Missouri, NRHP-listed
Fidelity National Building, Oklahoma City, Oklahoma, listed on the NRHP in Oklahoma County, Oklahoma
Fidelity Mutual Life Insurance Company Building, or Perelman Building, Philadelphia, Pennsylvania, NRHP-listed
Fidelity-Philadelphia Trust Company Building, or Wells Fargo Building, Philadelphia, Pennsylvania, NRHP-listed